Hans Bergh (born 6 June 1970) is a retired Swedish footballer. During his club career, Bergh played for IFK Sundsvall, Hammarby IF, Degerfors IF, Helsingborg, AIK, GIF Sundsvall and IFK Timrå. He made two appearances for the Sweden national team.

Honours

 Allsvenskan: 1998
 Svenska Cupen: 1997-98, 1998-99

References

External links

1970 births
Living people
Swedish footballers
Sweden international footballers
Association football midfielders
IFK Sundsvall players
Hammarby Fotboll players
Degerfors IF players
Helsingborgs IF players
AIK Fotboll players
GIF Sundsvall players
Allsvenskan players
People from Sundsvall
Sportspeople from Västernorrland County